The University Bridge is a double-leaf bascule bridge in Seattle, Washington that carries Eastlake Avenue traffic over Portage Bay between Eastlake to the south and the University District to the north. It opened on July 1, 1919, and was extensively rebuilt from 1932 to 1933. It is included in the National Register of Historic Places.

History
The bridge opened in 1919 under the name of Eastlake Avenue Bridge (also then known as the Tenth Avenue Northeast Bridge). It got its current and proper name on June 30, 1919.

By 1930, the bridge had begun to deteriorate enough for an extensive refit to be ordered: the timber trestle approaches were replaced with ones made out of concrete and steel, the control towers were rebuilt, and the wooden paving was replaced by the first application of open steel-mesh grating in the United States. Wooden paving had to be replaced every ten years or so; the steel-mesh grating has been replaced once, in 1990. The reconstructed bridge was opened April 7, 1933.

All three double-leaf bascule bridges (Ballard, Fremont, and University) were added to the National Register of Historic Places in 1982.

In 2014 its electronics were refitted. During especially hot summer days, the University Bridge need daily dousings with cool water to avoid expanding so much that they bind.

Sinkhole
On May 2, 2007, a  water main broke near the south end of the University Bridge, creating a  sinkhole forcing the closure of the bridge. The sinkhole also swallowed two unoccupied parked cars. The water main break compromised water quality and pressure in a large part of the Eastlake neighborhood, making tap water brown and unpotable. Many restaurants and other businesses were forced to close. There was concern for the integrity of a 40-inch main adjacent to the smaller one that broke. With the bridge closed, surface traffic between Seattle's University District and Downtown areas was heavily impacted. It was reopened on May 3, 2007, after city workers poured about 40 cubic yards of stabilizing concrete-sand slurry around the southern base of the bridge.

Occupy Seattle
On November 17, 2011, the University Bridge was shut down by demonstrators for about an hour and a half during the evening rush hour, snarling traffic around the University District. The demonstrators included Occupy Seattle protesters, students, union workers, and church leaders. The protests were part of a national Day of Action against cuts to infrastructure, health care, and education spending.

Pictures

References

External links

Seattle Department of Transportation: University Bridge

1919 establishments in Washington (state)
Bascule bridges in the United States
Bridges in Seattle
Bridges completed in 1919
Drawbridges on the National Register of Historic Places
National Register of Historic Places in Seattle
Road bridges on the National Register of Historic Places in Washington (state)